Uliana Kravchenko is the pen name of Julia Schneider (April 18, 1860 – March 31, 1947), was a Ukrainian educator, writer and the first Galician woman to publish a book of poetry.

She was born in Mykolaiv, currently in Stryi Raion of Lviv Oblast, grew up in Lviv and studied at a teaching seminary. Her first published work was a story that appeared in the journal Zoria. Kravchenko was active in the Ukrainian women's movement in Galicia. Women's liberation was a major theme in her poetry; she was considered to be the bard of the women's movement. She was also one of the first women teachers in Galicia.

Kravchenko died in Peremyshl (now Przemyśl, Poland) at the age of 86.

Selected works 
 Prima vera, poetry (1885)
 Na novyi shliakh ("Onto a New Road"), poetry (1891)
 Prolisky ("Anemones"), children's poetry (1921)
 V dorohu ("On Our Way"), children's poetry (1921)
 Lebedyna pisnia ("The Swan Song"), children's poetry )1924)
 V zhytti ie shchos’ ("There Is Something in Life"), poetry (1929)
 Dlia neï—vse! ("For Her—Everything!"), poetry (1931)
 Shelesty nam barvinochku ("Rustle for Us, Little Periwinkle"), children's poetry (1932)
 Moï tsvity ("My Flowers"), prose collection (1933)
 Zamist’ avtobiohrafiï ("Instead of An Autobiography"), memoirs (1934)
 Spohady uchytel’ky ("Memoirs of a Teacher"), memoirs (1935)
 Vybrani poeziï ("Selected Poems"), poetry (1941)
 Khryzantemy ("Chrysanthemums"), autobiographical novella (1961)

References 

1860 births
1947 deaths
Ukrainian women poets
Ukrainian children's writers
Ukrainian women's rights activists